Constable Debashish Sethy, SC was an Indian Police Constable of the Odisha Police's Special Operation Group (SOP) who was posthumously conferred India's third highest peacetime gallantry award, the Shaurya Chakra. 

Debashish began his career with the Odisha Police Department as a constable before joining the SOP in 2016. He was from Angul district.

The Commando was killed in action in the deep forest near Sirki village in Kalahandi district on September 9, 2020, while in combat with members of the Left Wing Extremism group during an anti-Maoist operation. Five terrorists were killed as a result of the operation.

Shaurya Chakra awardee 
The President of India posthumously awarded him the Shaurya Chakra, which was presented to his family by Angul SP Jagmohan Meena on August 15, 2021, in recognition of his bravery and sacrifice.

See also 
 Special Operation Group

References

2020 deaths
Year of birth missing
Indian police officers killed in the line of duty
Naxalite–Maoist insurgency
Odisha Police
Recipients of the Shaurya Chakra